Black Crown Initiate is an American extreme metal band from Reading, Pennsylvania, United States, currently signed to Century Media. The band formed in 2012 and self-released their first EP Song of the Crippled Bull, which was met with positive reviews. They began touring in early 2014 with fellow extreme metal bands such as Goatwhore, Behemoth, and 1349; this led to them being signed by eOne Music in June 2014. With eOne, they released both The Wreckage of Stars, released on September 30, 2014, and Selves We Cannot Forgive, released on July 22, 2016. Their third studio album, Violent Portraits of Doomed Escape, was released with Century Media on August 7, 2020.

When asked about the origins of the name "Black Crown Initiate" in a 2016 Reddit AMA, the band stated:

 There is a Tibetan spiritual leader that wears a black crown to signify help for humanity. We are all pervert pigs so we help by showing people that, first about ourselves.

History
Formed in late 2012, Black Crown Initiate released several demos onto SoundCloud, which led to the creation of their four track EP titled Song of the Crippled Bull.  The EP was recorded with Carson Slovak (August Burns Red, Texas In July) at Atrium Audio and was released on July 17, 2013. The EP quickly became the discussion of many underground metal blogs and publications. Due to the success of the EP, what had initially begun as a small project by guitarist Andy Thomas, vocalist James Dorton and bassist Nick Shaw became a full-time endeavor, and they began to recruit members for live performances. The band played their first live show on October 18, 2013, in their hometown with their longtime friends in the band Rivers of Nihil.

In January 2014 the band posted on their official Facebook page that they would be embarking on the 2014 Metal Alliance Tour supporting 1349, Goatwhore and Behemoth. This was the band's first tour, a rare feat for a band with only one four track EP and having been together for just over a year at the time. After finishing the tour, the band returned to the studio, again with Carson Slovak. On June 19 the band announced through their Facebook page, their signing to eOne Music, and that their full-length debut album would be on its way.

On signing with the label, guitarist Andy Thomas stated: “We started this band with absolutely no clue how far it would take us. It has been an amazing time, as of today, we can honestly say that we are starting a new chapter in our careers; one that will afford us opportunities that we never imagined. We are absolutely honored to be part of the eOne family.”

Later that summer, the band went on tour with Septicflesh and Fleshgod Apocalypse, followed by their first tour outside the US into Canada on the Summer Slaughter tour with The Faceless, Fallujah, and Rings of Saturn. The band shot a music video and released the first single off their upcoming album The Wreckage of Stars titled "Withering Waves". The album was officially released on September 30, 2014, and debuted at #18 on the Billboard Heatseekers chart.

Black Crown Initiate later appeared at several other festivals such as New England Hardcore Metal Fest, South By So What? and CMJ. In February 2016, the band announced they were back in the studio, again with Carson Slovak, to record their sophomore effort to be released in late spring 2016 through eOne Music. Black Crown Initiate went on tour in March 2016 along with label mates Black Fast. The tour lead them to Austin, Texas, where they performed at the SXSW festival for the first time in their careers. The band is also rumoured to be a part of the Metal Alliance Tour once again this time supporting Dying Fetus, The Acacia Strain and Jungle Rot.

In June 2016, the band announced that long-time guitarist Rik Stelzpflug was departing. He was replaced by former The Faceless guitarist Wes Hauch.

On 11 December 2018, the band announced on their official Facebook page that drummer Jesse Beahler and guitarist Wes Hauch had departed the band on good terms to be replaced with drummer Samuel Santiago (Gorod, Beyond Creation, Arkhon Infaustus) and guitarist Ethan McKenna who was the first guitarist that founding members Andy, James and Nick originally asked to join the band.

On 5 August 2022, founding member Andy Thomas announced he had left the band on good terms. The band confirmed his departure and that the band was continuing; however, they had not named a replacement. A day later on 6 August 2022, founding member Nick Shaw announced his departure  to focus on his role as a parent as well as working on making music for a new project that would soon be announced. No replacement has been named yet.

Tours

2014
Metal Alliance Tour from April 4 to May 3 with Behemoth, Goatwhore, 1349 and Inquisition.
Conquerors of the World Tour from June 22- July 12 with Septicflesh, Fleshgod Apocalypse and Necronomicon.
Summer Slaughter Canada Club Tour from August 14–28 with The Faceless, Rings of Saturn, Archspire, and Fallujah. 
Reading Rainbow Tour from September 19 to October 3 with Rivers of Nihil.
Hell or High Wattage Tour from October 13- October 22 with Unearth, Darkest Hour, Carnifex, Origin, and King Parrot.
Late Fall Tour from November 30 to December 14 with Crowbar and Unearth.

2015
Through Space and Grind Tour from January 27 to February 28 with Napalm Death, Voivod, Exhumed and Ringworm.
Metal Alliance Tour from May 26 to June 20 with Deicide, Entombed, and Hate Eternal. NOTE- Entombed was forced to drop off the tour due to financial concerns they were replaced by Lorna Shore. The tour continued as a Deicide headliner.
Wreckage of Canada Tour from March 25 to April 4.
North American Extinction Tour from September 15 to October 7 with Cattle Decapitation, King Parrot, and Dark Sermon.

2016
Blacker Than All Tour from March 6- March 17 with Black Fast
Metal Alliance Tour from April 29 to May 29 with Dying Fetus, The Acacia Strain and Jungle Rot.
The Sumerian Alliance European Tour in September–October with Born of Osiris, Veil of Maya and Volumes.
The Citadel World Tour in July–August with Ne Obliviscaris and Starkill

Members

Current
 James Dorton – lead vocals (2012–present)
 Ethan McKenna – rhythm guitar (2018–present)

Current live/touring members
 Greg Paulson – lead guitar (2022–present), rhythm guitar (2022)
 Zak Baskin – bass (2022–present)
 Joey Ferretti – drums (2022–present)

Former
 Nick Shaw – bass (2012–2022)
 Andy Thomas  – lead guitar, clean vocals (2012–2022)
 Rik Stelzpflug – rhythm guitar, backing vocals (2013–2015)
 Wes Hauch – rhythm guitar (2016–2018)
 Jeff Willet – drums (2012–2013)
 Jesse Beahler – drums (2013–2018)
 Samuel Santiago – drums (2018–2019)

Former live/touring members
 Nick Miller – bass (2019)

Chronology

Style

Black Crown Initiate is known for incorporating various elements of heavy metal and extreme music in their sound. There are traces of progressive metal, ambience, doom metal, and post-rock which often gives them comparisons to Opeth, Gojira, Mastodon, Decapitated and Cynic.

Discography
Extended Plays

Albums

References

American progressive metal musical groups
American technical death metal musical groups
American death metal musical groups
Long Branch Records artists
Musical quintets
Heavy metal musical groups from Pennsylvania